is a former Japanese footballer.

There were rumours saying that Junya Hosokawa interested to join a football club from Indonesia, Persiraja Banda Aceh.

Club stats
Updated to end of 2018 season.

References

External links
Profile at Mito HollyHock

1984 births
Living people
Sendai University alumni
Association football people from Saitama Prefecture
Japanese footballers
J1 League players
J2 League players
J3 League players
Vegalta Sendai players
Mito HollyHock players
FC Imabari players
Association football defenders